Rahovec or Orahovac (Serbian Cyrillic: Ораховац) is a town and municipality located in the District of Prizren in western Kosovo. According to the 2011 census, the town of Rahovec has 15,892 inhabitants, while the municipality has 56,208 inhabitants.

Name 
The Serbian name of the town, Orahovac, is derived from the Serbian orah, meaning "walnut". The Albanian name Rahovec comes from an Albanised pronunciation of Orahovac.

Ernst Eichler considers that the toponym delivers from Albanian term rrah, which delivers from Illyrian.

Geography and population 
In 2014 the town had a total population of 23,200 and the population of the municipality was 58,214. In 2011 the municipality had a total population of 56,208.

Demographics

According to the last official census done in 2011, the municipality of Orahovac has 56,208 inhabitants.

Ethnic groups
The ethnic composition of the municipality:

Language

The town is known for a local dialect, Rahovec dialect (ravëqki; rahovecianshe, gjuha e Rahovecit) which is a mixture of Albanian, Serbian, Turkish and Bulgarian languages. Its use has declined rapidly after the Kosovo War, with Albanian becoming the predominant language.

Notable people 

Shkëlzen Maliqi (born 1947), Kosovo Albanian former politician, born in Rahovec .
Ajet Shehu (born 1990), English footballer, born in Rahovec .
Ukshin Hoti (1943–1999), Kosovo Albanian activist, politician, and philosopher, born in Krusha e Madhe.
Ali Sokoli (1921–1974), Yugoslav physician, born in Rahovec .
Jovan Grković-Gapon (1879–1912), Serbian Chetnik, born in Rahovec .
Lazar Kujundžić (1880–1905), Serbian Chetnik commander, born in Rahovec .
Kida (born 1997), Kosovo Albanian female singer
Xhevdet Bajraj (1960–2022), poet and screenwriter who resided in Mexico.

Notes

References 

 Marijana Milosavljević (NIN, 15 December 2005)

External links 

 Rahoveci24.com 
 Rahoveci.NET 
 BBC article concerning March 2004 riots
 Statistical Office of Kosovo (SOK) 
 International Organization for Mifration (IOM)
 Survivors describe massacre in Orahovac
 Human Rights Publication-Massacre in Pastasel, Orahovac
 Photographic Evidence of Kosovo Genocide and Conflict

Cities in Kosovo